Samuel b. Jose b.

During his times, the Jerusalem Talmud was arranged by his father, Jose ben Abin.

He is quoted several times in the Jerusalem Talmud.

References

Talmud rabbis of the Land of Israel